The Museum im Kulturspeicher Würzburg is a municipal art museum located at Veitshöchheimer Strasse 5, Würzburg, Northern Bavaria, Germany. It is open daily except Monday; an admission fee is charged.

The museum opened in 2002 within a converted river-side warehouse that provides 3,500 m² of exhibit space in 12 rooms. It contains two distinct collections: the municipal art collection, founded in 1941 as the Städtische Gallerie and originally located in Hofstraße; and the Peter C. Ruppert Collection of European concrete art from World War II to the present day.

The municipal collection exhibits regional art, primarily from Franconia and Southern Germany, ranging from Biedermeier-style portraits and landscapes of the first half of the 19th century, through German impressionism and painters of the Berlin Secession, including Robert Breyer, Philipp Franck, Walter Leistikow, Joseph Oppenheimer, and Max Slevogt, as well as members of the Weimar Saxon-Grand Ducal Art School including Ludwig von Gleichen-Rußwurm and Franz Bunke. It also includes works by Bauhaus painter Hans Reichel and works from the estate of sculptor Emy Roeder, as well as about 30,000 graphics works.

The Ruppert collection includes concrete art from 22 European countries, incorporating a broad spectrum of materials and media, exhibited within six galleries (1,850 m² total area). Artists include Max Bill, John Carter, Andreas Christen, Ralph Eck, Christoph Freimann, Gerhard von Graevenitz, Erwin Heerich, Malcolm Hughes, Norbert Kricke, Richard Paul Lohse, Maurizio Nannucci, Nausika Pastra, Henry Prosi, Bridget Riley, Peter Sedgley, and Anton Stankowski.

References 
 Museum im Kulturspeicher Würzburg
 BAYERN.BY entry
 Undated pamphlet, Museum im Kulturspeicher Würzburg

Museum im Kulturspeicher Würzburg
Wurzburg
Museums in Bavaria
Art museums established in 2002
Museum im Kulturspeicher Würzburg